El Amor Que Merecemos (English: The Love That We Deserve) is the eighth studio album by Puerto Rican singer and songwriter Kany García, released on May 26, 2022 through Sony Music Latin. The album consists of ten songs, with 3 collaborations: Alejandro Sanz, Rozalén, and Jay Wheeler.

Track listing

Charts

Awards/Nominations

References

External links
Official Website

Kany García albums
Sony Music Latin albums